Family Reunion is a 1975 album by American R&B group The O'Jays.

Reception

The album was released in late 1975 on the Philadelphia International Records label. Recorded at Sigma Sound Studios in Philadelphia, and produced by Kenny Gamble and Leon Huff, Family Reunion includes the enduring classic "I Love Music" and "Livin' for the Weekend", both of which topped the R&B singles chart, and placed at #5 and #20 respectively on the pop chart. The ballad "Stairway to Heaven", originally issued as the B-side to "Livin' for the Weekend" and unrelated to the Led Zeppelin song of the same name, has also gone on to become a staple of quiet storm radio programming. While the title track did not chart, it still garnered airplay, as the lyrics (as well as the album artwork) focused on the importance of the family structure especially at gatherings.

Family Reunion became the group's third consecutive R&B chart-topping album, and its #7 peak on the pop chart was their highest placing on this chart at the time (1978's So Full of Love would peak one place higher). Family Reunion was awarded a Platinum Album for RIAA Certification of over one million copies sold.

Track listing

Charts
Album

Singles

See also
List of number-one R&B albums of 1975 (U.S.)

References

External links
 Family Reunion at Discogs

1975 albums
The O'Jays albums
Albums produced by Kenneth Gamble
Albums produced by Leon Huff
Albums arranged by Bobby Martin
Albums recorded at Sigma Sound Studios
Philadelphia International Records albums